The Architects of Hyperspace is a novel by Thomas R. McDonough published by Avon Books in 1987.

Plot summary
The Architects of Hyperspace is a novel in which Ariadne Zepos, noted oceanographer, explores a labyrinthe alien complex in an attempt to puzzle out its origin and purpose.

Reception
J. Michael Caparula reviewed The Architects of Hyperspace in Space Gamer/Fantasy Gamer No. 84. Caparula commented that "While I find the concept of benign trans-galactic intelligences somewhat overused, McDonough's scientific imagination lends credibility to the story, making for a satisfying read."

Reviews
 Review by Dan Chow (1987) in Locus, #321 October 1987
 Review by Don D'Ammassa (1988) in Science Fiction Chronicle, #101 February 1988
 Review by Tom Easton (1988) in Analog Science Fiction/Science Fact, May 1988
Kliatt

References

1987 American novels
Avon (publisher) books